Theodore Boone: The Abduction, written by John Grisham, is the second book in the Theodore Boone series. It is written for 11- to 13-year-olds.

Plot
13-year-old Theodore Boone's best friend April is not happy with her life. Her mother is a neglective hippie and her father leaves her mother and her at home for days on end to tour with his band.

The story begins with Theo being woken up in the middle of the night to find out that April has been abducted. The fear is that April's cousin, the notorious criminal Jack Leeper, has kidnapped her. He is seen around town and eventually caught. Leeper claims to know where April is but refuses to tell the police unless they agree to his conditions. Theo and his friends search the town but are stopped by unhelpful policemen. The rumours around April's disappearance are made worse when a body is pulled out of the river. The jaws are missing and the police cannot identify the clothing. However, after a few days of examining the body, the police discover it was a man.

Theo realizes that April could actually be with her dad, who is touring fraternity houses with his band. When Theo's parents leave for a law conference out of town, they leave Theo with the Whipples, who are friends of the family. Once Theo arrives at the Whipples' house, he and Chase Whipple search for pictures of April's father's band on Facebook pages and eventually spot a girl whom they assume to be April standing near the band in one of the pictures. Theo persuades his uncle Ike to drive him to the next destination of April's father's band while Chase distracts his older sister, who is supposed to be watching them, by lying about their activities.

Once Ike and Theo arrive at the fraternity house, they go to find April in the basement, where a party is going on. The two grab April and escape the basement to find one of the members of the band demanding to know what they're doing with April. Ike quickly concocts a lie about being friends with April's family and wanting to catch up with her. The band member lets them go and the trio drives back to Strattenburg.

Safely back at home, Theo is praised for finding April, and April's family goes to court to decide what changes will be implemented within their family life. During this fast-paced novel, Theodore Boone is desperate for solutions. On one desperate turn, he decides to rely on the family reject, Ike Boone. April is in trouble.

Characters
Theodore 'Theo' Boone - The main character
April Finnemore - Theo's best friend
Marcella Boone - Theo's Mother
 Woods Boone - Theo's father
Jack Leeper - An escapee from a prison in California
May Finnemore - April's Mother
Tom Doody - April's Father
Ike - Theo's Uncle (2nd 'dad')
Chase Whipple - Theo's other friend
Judge - Theo's dog

Sequel
 Theodore Boone: The Accused released May 2012

References 

 Theodore Boone: The Abduction at Amazon.com

2011 American novels
Novels by John Grisham
Legal thriller novels
American children's novels
2011 children's books
E. P. Dutton books
Hodder & Stoughton books